The Raurimu Spiral is a single-track railway spiral, starting with a horseshoe curve, overcoming a  height difference, in the central North Island of New Zealand, on the North Island Main Trunk railway (NIMT) between Wellington and Auckland. It is a notable feat of civil engineering, having been called an "engineering masterpiece." The Institute of Professional Engineers of New Zealand has designated the spiral as a significant engineering heritage site.

Background 
During the construction of the central section of the NIMT, a major obstacle arose: how to cross the steep slopes between the North Island Volcanic Plateau to the east and the valleys and gorges of the Whanganui River to the west? 

South of Taumarunui, the terrain is steep but not unmanageable, with the exception of the stretch between Raurimu and National Park, where the land rises too steeply for a direct rail route. The area was thoroughly surveyed during the 1880s in an attempt to find a route with a lesser grade, but the only viable possibility seemed to require a  detour and nine massive viaducts. Even then, the gradient would have been over 1 in 50.

Construction 
The problem was solved in 1898 by a surveyor in the employ of Robert Holmes, Public Works Department engineer. He proposed a line that looped back upon itself and then spiralled around with the aid of tunnels and bridges, rising at a gradient of 1 in 52. Though costly and labour-intensive, the scheme was still cheaper than the previous plan by Browne and Turner which required 9 viaducts down the Piopiotea River. The most remarkable feature is that even today there is no place to view the complete line. By all accounts, Holmes visualised the layout in his imagination.

The railway forms an ascending spiral southwards, with two relatively short tunnels, a circle and three hairpin bends. From the north, trains pass Raurimu before going round a 200° bend to the left in a horseshoe curve, climbing above the track on which they have just travelled. Two sharp bends to the right follow, after which the line passes through two short tunnels, the Lower Spiral Tunnel (384 m) and the Upper Spiral Tunnel (96 m).

Some of the sharp curves are only 7½ chains (150 m) radius.

Although spirals are relatively common in the Alps, particularly in Switzerland, they generally involve extensive tunnelling inside mountainsides. A masterly feature of Holmes' layout is the way in which it uses natural land contours so that no viaducts are needed, and only two short tunnels.

Legend has it that a locomotive engineer once put on the emergency brakes of his train in the night upon mistaking the light of his Guard's Van on a nearby part of the spiral as the rear of a different train directly ahead of him.

See also 
 North Island Main Trunk
 Raurimu railway station
 Spiral (railway)
 Spiral tunnels and tunnels on a curved alignment
 Tehachapi Loop

References

Citations

Bibliography

By Design: A brief history of the Public Works Department Ministry of Works 1870–1970 by Rosslyn J. Noonan (1975, Crown Copyright) Appendix XIV, The Raurimu Spiral by J. H. Christie (pages 312–315).

External links 

1906 photo of cutting being excavated at what was then known as Pukerimu
NZ Engineering Heritage North Island Main Trunk line page
Raurimu Spiral (NZR Publicity pamphlet)

The New Zealand Railways Magazine, Volume 11, Issue 6 (1 September 1936) digitised at NZETC

Buildings and structures in Manawatū-Whanganui
Heritage New Zealand Category 1 historic places in Manawatū-Whanganui
Rail transport in Manawatū-Whanganui
Ruapehu District
Railway attractions in New Zealand
Rail infrastructure in New Zealand